Uber Geek is the fourth studio album by Luke Ski. The album was released in 2002.

Track listing
"My Name Is Al Bundy"
A parody of "My Name Is" by Eminem
A song about the TV show Married... with Children
"Fanboy"
A parody of "Cowboy" by Kid Rock
A song about fanboys
"Use The Force"
A parody of "Give It Up" by Public Enemy
A song about Star Wars: Episode I – The Phantom Menace
"In The Line Again"
A parody of "On The Road Again" by Willie Nelson
A song about waiting in line to see the next Star Wars
"Peter Parker"
A parody of "Peter Piper" by Run DMC
A song about Spider-Man
"Bender Roboto"
A parody of "Mr. Roboto" by Styx
A song about Futurama
"Theme From Ash"
A parody of "Theme From Shaft" by Isaac Hayes
A song about Pokémon
"Wannabe A Slayer"
A parody of "Wannabe" by The Spice Girls
A song about the TV show Buffy the Vampire Slayer
"I Am A Vamp Of Constant Sorrow"
A parody of "I Am A Man Of Constant Sorrow" by The Soggy Bottom Boys
A song about the TV series Angel
"Who Let The Frog Out?"
A parody of "Who Let The Dogs Out?" by the Baha Men
A song about Muppets and their creator, Jim Henson
"Keanu Man"
A parody of "Piano Man" by Billy Joel
A song about Keanu Reeves
"C'mon Ride The Bus"
A parody of "C'mon N' Ride It (The Train)" by Quad City DJs
A song about commemorating "Weird Al" Yankovic's legendary live recording of "Another One Rides The Bus" on the Dr. Demento Show
"Everyone's Free To Earn Profit"
A parody of "Everyone’s Free (To Wear Sunscreen)" by Baz Luhrmann
A song about Star Trek: Deep Space Nine
"It's A Fanboy Christmas"
A pastiche of holiday music
A song about fandom and Christmas

References

Luke Ski albums
2002 albums